Eurylepis is a genus of skinks found in Asia.

Species
There are two species:
Eurylepis poonaensis – Poona skink
Eurylepis taeniolata ribbon-sided skink, alpine Punjab skink, yellow-bellied mole skink

References

Eurylepis
Reptiles of Asia
Lizard genera
Taxa named by Edward Blyth